Breaking the Impasse (BTI) is an advocacy group consisting of Israeli and Palestinian business leaders. BTI's aim is to urge the Israeli government and Palestinian Authority leadership to reach a peace agreement based on the two-state solution.

BTI was launched in 2013 under the auspices of the World Economic Forum. The leading members of the group are Palestinian businessman Munib al-Masri and Israeli high-tech entrepreneur Yossi Vardi.

BTI has been backed by over 300 Israeli and Palestinian business figures.  Of the group's members, around 120 are Palestinians from the West Bank or Jerusalem.

History

Conception in Davos (2012) 
The idea of forming a pressure group led by Israeli and Palestinian business figures was conceived at a meeting of the World Economic Forum in Davos, Switzerland in June 2012.

Launch Press Conference (2013) 
Breaking the Impasse was launched at a press conference in the Dead Sea on 26 May 2013. The press conference panel consisted of: Munib al-Masri, Yossi Vardi, Palestinian businessman Samir Huleileh (CEO of Padico Holdings) and Riad Kamal (then Vice-Chairman, Arabtec Holding), Israeli venture capitalist Yadin Kaufmann (Founding Partner, Sadara Ventures), and was chaired by Adrian Monck of the World Economic Forum.

At the launch, Vardi stated:“We saw 300 of the most influential people...[who] stood tall, and said ‘enough is enough'. This alone sent a clear and distinct tone to the politicians, and I think they will take it into consideration. Maybe we’ll fail… I don’t think that we will fail, but at least we will say that we tried as hard as we could.”Al-Masri stated:“It’s not for us to iron out the details. We are worried by the status quo. We want to change the status quo… Now the Israeli and Palestinian side [of the initiative] are very honest in their appeal: They want to break the impasse… They want the two sides to negotiate… to push all the parties to engage in real negotiations.”

Advertising campaign in Israel (2014) 
In January 2014, BTI members launched a 10-day media campaign in Israel including advertisements in the press and public billboards. The campaign, which costed around $286,000, included the slogans such as “Bibi, only you can” (addressing Israeli Prime Minister Benjamin Netanyahu) and “A strong country signs an agreement”.

Supporting business figures

Palestinian supporters 
Among the Palestinian supporters of BTI are:

 Munib al-Masri (Chairman, Edgo Group and Padico Holdings)
 Samir Huleileh (CEO, Padico Holdings)
 Riad Kamal (then Vice-Chairman, Arabtec Holding)
 Rafiq Masri (founder and president, Network Management, Inc.)
 Riman Barakat (founder & CEO, Experience Palestine)

Israeli supporters 
Among the Israeli supporters of BTI are:

 Yossi Vardi (tech entrepreneur and angel investor)
Yadin Kaufmann (founder, Sadara Ventures and Veritas Ventures)
 Edouard Cukierman (founder, Catalyst Funds)
 Ofra Strauss (chairwoman, Strauss Group)
 Gad Propper (former director and CEO, Osem Investments)
 Yehuda and Yehudit Bronicki (controlling shareholders, Ormat Industries Ltd.)
 Yoram Yaacovi (then general manager, Microsoft Israel)
 Rami Levy (founder and CEO, Rami Levy Hashikma Marketing)
 Eyal Waldman (cofounder, Mellanox Technologies)

Failure
Following the 2014 Operation Protective Edge when Israel launched a military operation against Palestine, the initiative largely ground to a halt as the business leaders of both sides refused to cooperate before their political leaders made any moves.

References 

Israeli–Palestinian joint economic efforts
Israeli–Palestinian conflict
Israeli–Palestinian peace process